The  Huobosi (simplified: 火不思; pinyin: Huǒbùsī) is a stringed musical instrument from China. The name is a transliteration into Chinese of a Turkmenian name for the instrument.

It has four strings in four courses and is tuned E, A, D, G. Three of the strings are made of silk and the highest is steel.

It was developed through a rationalization of an earlier Turkmenian instrument (the Komuz), and used the Chinese name for that instrument. The models were developed, soprano alto and tenor.

History

The Huobosi is played by the Naxi people in China, and was historically a carved lute with a shape similar to the draynen. In modern times, the huobosi is built with a flat back and bent sides (ribs) in a similar shape, but with a generally shorter neck than the historical version.

References
 The Stringed Instrument Database
 ATLAS of Plucked Instruments
 火不思----實驗中的民族低音樂器 (An account of the development of the hubusi, in Mandarin)

External links 
A video of a duet between a tenor and soprano huobusi 
A video of a huobusi recital with introduction 
A video of a huobusi recital with synth orchestration 
A documentary on the evolution of the huobusi with footage of a concert

String instruments
Chinese musical instruments